Jan Lauwers (born 5 October 1938) is a Belgian former road cyclist. Professional from 1962 to 1967, he notably won 3 stages of the Vuelta a España, Schaal Sels and the GP du canton d'Argovie.

Major results

1962
 1st Schaal Sels
1963
 1st Stages 4 & 11 Vuelta a España
 5th Druivenkoers-Overijse
 5th Ronde van Brabant
1964
 1st GP du canton d'Argovie
 3rd Omloop van de Fruitstreek
 4th Ronde van Brabant
1965
 2nd GP Union Dortmund
 5th GP Stad Vilvoorde
 6th Ronde van Limburg
 10th GP du canton d'Argovie
1966
 1st GP Stad Vilvoorde
 2nd GP Victor Standaert
 2nd Omloop der Vlaamse Gewesten
 6th Elfstedenronde
 8th Druivenkoers-Overijse
 8th Ronde van Brabant
1967
 1st Stage 9 Vuelta a España
 2nd Brabantse Pijl
 2nd GP Stad Vilvoorde
 10th Omloop Het Volk

References

External links
 

1938 births
Living people
Belgian male cyclists
People from Zemst
Belgian Vuelta a España stage winners
Cyclists from Flemish Brabant
20th-century Belgian people